Chrysaora lactea is a sea nettle in the family Pelagiidae. It has also been reported from the Caribbean region, but genetic studies indicate that this population is closer to C. chesapeakei. A comprehensive taxonomic review is necessary to resolve this matter.

References

Chrysaora
Animals described in 1829